Gerald Matthews Balding (1903 – 16 September 1957) was a British champion polo player.

Biography
He was born in Leicestershire, England, in 1903. He had two brothers who also played polo, Ivor Godfrey Balding and John Barnard "Barney" Balding. His sons, Gerald Barnard "Toby" Balding and Ian Balding, were both thoroughbred racehorse trainers in Britain.

He remains the United Kingdom's last 10 goal polo player since 1939. Of the state of polo in England in the 1930s, he said, "Polo is not taken so seriously as in America or Argentina."

The Gerald Balding Cup is held annually at Cirencester Park Polo Club in his memory. In the 1920s he played in England, America and India. In 1930, 1936 and 1939, he played for England against the US for the Westchester Cup and was field captain of the English team in 1939. He was a brilliant striker of the ball and was rated as one of the finest players ever seen.

He died on 16 September 1957 in London, England.

His granddaughter is broadcaster and journalist Clare Balding.

Publication
Gerald Balding, "Polo as the English Play it," The Sportsman, September 1937, 36.

See also
List of significant families in British horse racing

References

1903 births
1957 deaths
Gerald Balding
Sportspeople from Leicestershire
International Polo Cup
British polo players